USS LST-28 was a United States Navy  used exclusively in the Europe-Africa-Middle East Theater during World War II. Like many of her class, she was not named and is properly referred to by her hull designation.

Construction
LST-28 was laid down on 8 December 1942, at Pittsburgh, Pennsylvania, by the Dravo Corporation; launched on 19 April 1943; sponsored by Mrs. Michael Torick; and commissioned on 19 June 1943.

Service history
There are records that indicate she traveled from Oran, Algeria, joining Convoy MKS 46 sometime after 9 April 1944, arriving in Gibraltar on 21 April 1944. She departed Gibraltar on 22 April 1944, with Convoy MKS 46G to rendezvous with Convoy SL 155 on April 23, 1944, arriving in Liverpool on 3 May 1944.

She participated in the Normandy invasion, June 1944.

She sailed from St. Helen's Roads, 21 March 1945, arriving in Le Havre, the same day, in Convoy WVL 109. She again left St. Helen's Roads, on 30 April 1945, arriving in Le Havre, the next day, 1 May 1945, in Convoy WVC 138.

Postwar career
LST-28 was decommissioned on 16 August 1946, and was struck from the Navy list on 29 October 1946. On 19 May 1948, she was sold to George H. Nutman, of Brooklyn, New York, for scrapping.

Awards
LST-28 earned two battle stars for her World War II service.

References

Bibliography

External links

 

LST-1-class tank landing ships of the United States Navy
World War II amphibious warfare vessels of the United States
Ships built in Pittsburgh
1943 ships
Ships built by Dravo Corporation